Music Has the Right to Children is the debut studio album by Scottish electronic music duo Boards of Canada. It was released on 20 April 1998 in the UK by Warp and Skam Records and in the US by Matador. The album was produced at Hexagon Sun, the duo's personal recording studio in Pentland Hills, and continued their distinctive style of electronica, featuring vintage synthesisers, degraded analogue production, found sounds and samples, and hip hop-inspired rhythms that had been featured on their first two EPs Twoism (1995) and Hi Scores (1996).

The album received critical acclaim upon its release, and has since been acknowledged as a landmark work in electronic music, going on to inspire a variety of subsequent artists. It has been included on various best-ever lists by publications such as Pitchfork and Mojo.

Background 
The members of Boards of Canada, brothers Michael Sandison and Marcus Eoin, had been creating music together as early as 1981, layering synths over cassette recordings of shortwave radio. Throughout the 1990s, the band were members of the Hexagon Sun artistic collective based in Pentland Hills, Scotland, and released self-produced cassettes produced in small quantities and given to friends and family members. According to Eoin,"We'd been recording in various forms of the band as teens through much of the '80s, and already had a big collection of our own old crappy recordings that we were really fond of. Then, around 1987 or 1988, we were beginning to experiment with collage tapes of demos we'd deliberately destroyed, to give the impression of chewed up library tapes that had been found in a field somewhere. That was the seed for the whole project. In those days, everyone used to have drawers full of unique cassettes with old snippets from radio and TV, it's kind of a lost thing now, sadly. To me, it's fascinating and precious to find some lost recordings in a cupboard, so part of it was an idea to create new music that really felt like an old familiar thing."In 1996, the band completed their first wide release, the Hi Scores EP, and began sending it out for record labels to hear. Sean Booth of Autechre heard the EP, and suggested that the band get in touch with SKAM Records, whose first release had been Booth's LEGO Feet album in 1991. SKAM released Hi Scores, and invited the band to produce a full-length follow-up. At the same time, the band established a relationship with Warp Records, who also wished to release an album by the band. As a compromise, the album would eventually be jointly released by both labels.

Production and recording
The album was recorded in the duo's studio in Pentland Hills, which had been described as a "bunker" by various media publications. The duo described this as "just an exaggeration on the part of the record label" in an interview around the time of the album's release.

The album features the duo utilizing samplers, intentionally detuned vintage synthesizers, drum machines and reel to reel tape recorders. It also incorporates a wide variety of samples, including several from the children's television program Sesame Street in tracks such as "The Color of the Fire" and "Aquarius". The track "Happy Cycling" samples the sound of the red-legged seriema from Vangelis' score for the 1976 documentary La Fête sauvage.

During the production of the track "Rue the Whirl", the studio's window was left open, and the sound of birds was accidentally recorded into the track. The duo decided that the track was enhanced by the natural sounds, and left it in.

"Smokes Quantity" first appeared on Twoism in 1995, and several other tracks previously appeared on the duo's 1996 limited release Boc Maxima, albeit in different forms. "The Color of the Fire" first appeared in a shorter form on A Few Old Tunes as "I Love U". The short vignettes appended to the end of "Triangles and Rhombuses" and "Sixtyten" predate the album and are sourced from the duo's own library of shorter tracks and demos, which they have sampled throughout their discography.

 Music and style 
In interviews, the band has identified Devo, Wendy Carlos, DAF, TV and film soundtracks, Jeff Wayne, Julian Cope, My Bloody Valentine, 1980s pop music, and Seefeel as influences of the album's sound. According to Eoin, the band was uninterested in the styles of electronic music that were popular at the time of the album's creation, and that creating dance music was not a priority for them.

According to the band, the album's titles contain "cryptic references that the listener might understand or might not," many of them personal to the band.  "Our titles are always cryptic references which the listener might understand or might not. Some of them are personal, so the listener is unlikely to know what it refers to. Music Has the Right to Children is a statement of our intention to affect the audience using sound. "The Color of the Fire" was a reference to a friend's psychedelic experience. "Kaini Industries" is a company that was set up in Canada (by coincidence in the month Mike was born), to create employment for a settlement of Cree Indians. "Olson" is the surname of a family we know, and "Smokes Quantity" is the nickname of a friend of ours.""Pete Standing Alone" shares its name with the main character of the documentary Circle of the Sun (1960) directed by Colin Low and released by the National Film Board of Canada.

 Album art and packaging 
The album cover is a modified version of a family photo taken at Banff Springs in Alberta, Canada.  According to Sandison,“If there's sadness in the way we use memory, it's because the time you're focusing on has gone forever… It's a theme we play on a lot, that bittersweet thing where you face up to the fact that certain chapters of your life are just Polaroids now.”
The original CD was released in a traditional jewel case, while the 2004 re-release was packaged in digipak format. "Happy Cycling" was mistakenly left off 500 copies of the initial North American release of the album despite the artwork indicating that the song was included. The vinyl record was released in a gatefold sleeve with a sticker that wrote the band's name in braille attached to it.

Critical reception

The album received extensively widespread acclaim upon release. In 2014, AllMusic called it "a landmark for electronic listening music that was widely copied." Fact called it "an adult meditation on childhood, concerned with play, naïveté and nostalgia, all tinted with rosy pastoralism," but "also devilishly subtle, intricate and emotionally mature." Slant Magazine described the album as "nestled somewhere in between the warm hues of 1970s flocked wallpaper and the sleek electronic sheen of the future." Pitchfork stated that the duo "tapped into the collective unconscious of those who grew up in the English speaking West and were talented enough to transcribe the soundtrack."

 Legacy and influence 
Since its release, the album has frequently been included in lists of greatest albums of all time. Music Has the Right to Children featured at number 26 on Pitchforks "The 150 Best Albums of the 1990s" list, as well as number 2 on its "50 Best IDM Albums of All Time" list released in 2017. It was ranked number 91 in Mojo magazine's "100 Modern Classics" list.  The album was also included in the book 1001 Albums You Must Hear Before You Die.

The album has been noted as a major influence on the electronic music genre. Reflecting on its 20th anniversary, Sean O'Neal of The A.V. Club noted that "it practically created its own subgenre, inspiring a legion of artists who had similar goals of getting inside your head." Fact'' magazine identified Lone, Gold Panda, Lapalux, Tim Hecker, Leyland Kirby, Bibio, Four Tet, and Ulrich Schnauss as musicians directly influenced by the album, calling it not "just a classic album or many people's personal favourite," but also "an artifact in its own lifetime, a present-day relic that recalls an innocent time in more ways than one."

Track listing

Charts

Certifications

References

External links
 Music Has the Right to Children at Warp
 
 

Boards of Canada albums
1998 debut albums
Warp (record label) albums
Skam Records albums
Matador Records albums
Ambient techno albums